Pindell is a surname. Notable people with the surname include:

Henry M. Pindell (1860–1924), American journalist, businessman, and politician
Howardena Pindell (born 1943), American artist, curator, and educator
Terry Pindell, American travel writer

English-language surnames